Parnassius nordmanni is a high altitude butterfly which is found the Caucasus. It is a member of the snow Apollo genus (Parnassius) of the swallowtail family, Papilionidae. The larva feeds on Corydalis species including C. alpestris, C. conorhiza and C. emanueli.

Description
Similar to Parnassius ariadne but the forewing without submarginal macular band, the vitreous margin is considerably widened, there being often a blackish spot before the hindmargin; ocelli of hindwing reddish yellow, distal margin glossy grey. The female strongly marked, partly powdered with blackish scaling; costal spot of forewing enlarged to an abbreviated band; the ocelli of the hindwing sometimes connected by a black line. Underside without basal spots. In ab. trimaculata Schaposchn. the anal spot bears sometimes a distinct red pupil, being ocellus-like.

Subspecies
The taxa described within this species are most probably only infrasubspeciflc varieties.
Parnassius nordmanni bogosi (Bang-Haas, 1934)
Parnassius nordmanni christophi (Bryk & Eisner, 1932)
Parnassius nordmanni pataraeus (Westwood, 1852)
Parnassius nordmanni thomai (de Freina, 1980)
Parnassius nordmanni trimaculata (Schaposchnikow, 1904)

Type locality
The type locality is  “Monti / Adschara” (by lectotype designation).

References

 Weiss, J.C., 1999. The Parnassiinae of the World. Part 3. Hillside Books, Canterbury, UK, p. 137-236.

Further reading
sv:Parnassius nordmanni - Swedish Wikipedia provides further references and synonymy

External links
Parnassius nordmanni at Russian Insects

nordmanni
Butterflies described in 1850